Mike Manzini (born 29 November 1972 in Hoedspruit, Limpopo) is a South African former association football defender. He spent his entire career at Premier Soccer League club Mamelodi Sundowns and also played for South Africa.

Manzini was Sundowns' ever-reliable and efficient captain who made well over 250 appearances for the club. His good work in defence often went unnoticed by onlookers but it was a sign of his experience, composure and superb reading of the play that he very rarely found himself having to make a last-gasp tackle or clearance.

See also 

List of one-club men in association football

References 

1972 births
Living people
People from Maruleng Local Municipality
Association football defenders
South African soccer players
South Africa international soccer players
Mamelodi Sundowns F.C. players
Sportspeople from Limpopo